The Islamic Republic of Iran and the Syrian Arab Republic are close strategic allies, and Iran has provided significant support for the Syrian government in the Syrian civil war, including logistical, technical and financial support, as well as training and some combat troops. Iran sees the survival of the Syrian government as being crucial to its regional interests. When the uprising developed into the Syrian Civil War, there were increasing reports of Iranian military support, and of Iranian training of the National Defence Forces both in Syria and Iran. In early 2012, Iran's IRGC began sending tens of thousands of Khomeinist militants in co-ordination with Assad regime to prevent the collapse of the Syrian Arab Army; thereby polarising the conflict along sectarian lines.

Iranian security and intelligence services are advising and assisting the Syrian military in order to preserve Bashar al-Assad's hold on power. Those efforts include training, technical support, and combat troops. Estimates of the number of Iranian personnel in Syria range from hundreds to tens of thousands. Lebanese Hezbollah fighters, backed by Iran's government, have taken direct combat roles since 2012. From the summer of 2013, Iran and Hezbollah provided important battlefield support for Assad, allowing it to make advances on the opposition. 

In 2014, coinciding with the peace talks at Geneva II, Iran stepped up support for Syrian President Assad. Estimates of financial assistance range from tens to hundreds of billions of dollars. Iranian regime has portrayed its intervention as part of a religious and historical revanchist mission to subordinate Sunnis and seek vengeance. Tehran's objectives include attempts to Shi'ification through religious prozelytisation, establishment of shrines and demographic transformations in Sunni-majority regions by bringing in foreign shia settlers.

From January 2013 onward, the Iranian military, primarily the Islamic Revolutionary Guard Corps has lost more than 2,300 soldiers in Syria. Many of the deaths have been officers, including several high-ranking officers, notably generals. Thousands of Iranian-backed Afghan, Lebanese, Iraqi, Yemeni, Pakistani and other militia fighters have also been killed after joining IRGC-sponsored paramilitary organizations. The Afghans are recruited largely from Hazara refugees in Iran, and some had combat experience before joining; their relation to the Iranian military is only vaguely acknowledged and sometimes denied, despite the troops being uniformed fighters led by IRGC officers, trained and equipped in Iran, with state funerals involving uniformed IRGC personnel. Among the dead are 2,000+ Afghans and at least 160 Pakistanis. Officially, the Afghan paramilitaries are part of the independent Liwa Fatemiyoun group, while the Pakistanis are part of the Liwa Zainebiyoun group.

Iranian troops and allied militias on the ground are supported by ballistic missile and air forces, including armed drones utilizing smart munitions. By October 2018, Iranian drones had launched over 700 strikes on Islamic State forces alone.

Background

Iran sees the survival of the Syrian government as being crucial to its interest. Its only consistent ally since the 1979 Islamic revolution, Syria provides a crucial thoroughfare to Hezbollah in Lebanon. Iranian leaders have cited Syria as being Iran's "35th province", with President Bashar al-Assad's Alawite minority led government being a crucial buffer against the influence of Saudi Arabia and the United States.

The Syrian city of Zabadani is vitally important to Assad and to Iran because, at least as late as June 2011, the city served as the Islamic Revolutionary Guard Corps's logistical hub for supplying Hezbollah. Prior to the Syrian war, Iran had between 2,000 and 3,000 IRGC officers stationed in Syria, helping to train local troops and managing supply routes of arms and money to neighboring Lebanon.

In April 2014, Hossein Amir-Abdollahian, Iranian deputy foreign minister said, "We aren't seeking to have Bashar Assad remain president for life. But we do not subscribe to the idea of using extremist forces and terrorism to topple Assad and the Syrian government".

Timeline

2011
In the civil uprising phase of the Syrian civil war, Iran was said to be providing Syria with technical support based on Iran's capabilities developed following the 2009–2010 Iranian election protests.

In April 2011 U.S. President Barack Obama and U.S. Ambassador to the United Nations Susan Rice accused Iran of secretly aiding Assad in his efforts to quell the protests, and there were reports of Syrian protesters hearing security-force members speaking Persian.

The Guardian reported in May 2011 that the Iranian government was assisting the Syrian government with riot control equipment and intelligence monitoring techniques. According to US journalist Geneive Abdo writing in September 2011, the Iranian government provided the Syrian government with technology to monitor e-mail, cell phones and social media. Iran developed these capabilities in the wake of the 2009 protests and spent millions of dollars establishing a "cyber army" to track down dissidents online. Iran's monitoring technology is believed to be among the most sophisticated in the world, perhaps only second to China.

2012
In May 2012, in an interview with the Iranian Students News Agency which was later removed from its website, the deputy head of Iran's Quds Force said that it had provided combat troops to support Syrian military operations. It was alleged by the Western media that Iran also trained fighters from Hezbollah, a Shia militant group based in Lebanon. Iraq, located between Syria and Iran, was criticized by the U.S. for allowing Iran to ship military supplies to Assad over Iraqi airspace.

The Economist said that Iran had, by February 2012, sent the Syrian government $9 billion to help it withstand Western sanctions. It has also shipped fuel to the country and sent two warships to a Syrian port in a display of power and support.

In March 2012, anonymous U.S. intelligence officials claimed a spike in Iranian-supplied arms and other aid for the Syrian government. Iranian security officials also allegedly traveled to Damascus to help deliver this assistance. A second senior U.S. official said members of Iran's main intelligence service, the Ministry of Intelligence and Security, were assisting Syrian counterparts in charge of the crackdown.

According to a U.N. panel in May 2012, Iran supplied the Syrian government with arms during the previous year despite a ban on weapons exports by the Islamic Republic. Turkish authorities captured crates and a truck in February 2012, including assault rifles, machine guns, explosives, detonators, 60mm and 120mm mortar shells as well as other items on its border. It was believed these were destined for the Syrian government. The confidential report leaked just hours after an article appeared in The Washington Post revealing how Syrian opposition fighters started to receive more, and better, weapons in an effort paid for by Persian Gulf Arab states and co-ordinated partly by the US. The report investigated three large illegal shipments of Iranian weapons over the past year and stated "Iran has continued to defy the international community through illegal arms shipments. Two of these cases involved [Syria], as were the majority of cases inspected by the Panel during its previous mandate, underscoring that Syria continues to be the central party to illicit Iranian arms transfers." More anonymous sources were cited by the UN in May 2012, as it claimed arms were moving both ways between Lebanon and Syria, and alleged weapons brought in from Lebanon were being used to arm the opposition. The alleged spike in Iranian arms was likely a response to a looming influx of weapons and ammunition to the rebels from Gulf states that had been reported shortly before.

On 24 July 2012, Islamic Revolutionary Guards Corp commander Massoud Jazayeri said Iranians would not allow enemy plans to change Syria's political system to succeed.

In August 2012 Leon Panetta accused Iran of setting up a pro-Government militia to fight in Syria, and chairman of the joint chiefs of staff General Martin Dempsey compared it to the Mahdi Army of Iraqi Shia leader Muqtada al-Sadr. Panetta said that there was evidence that the Iranian Revolutionary Guards were attempting to "train a militia within Syria to be able to fight on behalf of the regime". 48 Iranians were captured by the FSA in Damascus, and U.S. officials said that the men who were captured were "active-duty Iranian Revolutionary Guard members".

In September 2012, Western intelligence officials stated that Iran had sent 150 senior members of the Iranian Revolutionary Guards to preserve the Assad government, and had also sent hundreds of tons of military equipment (among them guns, rockets, and shells) to the Assad government via an air corridor that Syria and Iran jointly established. These officials believed that the intensification of Iranian support had led to increased effectiveness against the Free Syrian Army by the Assad government.

According to rebel soldiers speaking in October 2012, Iranian Unmanned aerial vehicles had been used to guide Syrian military planes and gunners to bombard rebel positions. CNN reported that the UAV or drones—which the rebels refer to as "wizwayzi" were "easily visible from the ground and seen in video shot by rebel fighters".

Rebels have displayed captured aircraft they describe as Iranian-built drones — brightly colored, pilotless jets. They're accompanied by training manuals emblazoned with the image of Iran's revolutionary leader, the late Ayatollah Ruhollah Khomeini.

2013
In January 2013, a prisoner swap took place between the Syrian Rebels and the Syrian Government authorities. According to reports, 48 Iranians were released by the Rebels in exchange for nearly 2,130 prisoners held by the Syrian Government. Rebels claimed the captives were linked to the IRGC. US State Department spokeswoman Victoria Nuland described the Iranians as "members of the Iranian Revolutionary Guard," calling it "just another example of how Iran continues to provide guidance, expertise, personnel, technical capabilities to the Syrian regime."

Iran decided in June 2013 to send 4,000 troops to aid the Syrian government forces, described as a "first contingent" by Robert Fisk of The Independent, who added that the move underscored a Sunni vs. Shiite alignment in the Middle East. IRGC soldiers, along with fellow Shi'ite forces from Hezbollah and members of Iran's Basij militia participated in the capture of Qusair from rebel forces on 9 June 2013. In 2014, Iran increased its deployment of IRGC in Syria. Iran  also proposed to open a new Syrian front against Israel in the Golan Heights, this coming a day after Egyptian President cut off diplomatic relations with Syria and demanded that Iran support for the pro Syrian-government Hezbollah end. A Syrian official called the severing of relations by Morsi "irresponsible" and said it was part of a move by the U.S. and Israel to exacerbate divisions in the region.

According to American officials questioned by journalist Dexter Filkins, officers from the Quds force have "coordinated attacks, trained militias, and set up an elaborate system to monitor rebel communications" in Syria from late 2012 to 2013. With help from the Hezbollah, and under the leadership of Quds Force general Qassem Soleimani, the al-Assad government won back strategic territory from rebels in 2013, in particular an important supply route during the Al-Qusayr offensive in April and May.

In the fall of 2013 Iranian Brigadier General Mohammad Jamali-Paqaleh of the Revolutionary Guards was killed in Syria, while volunteering to defend a Shia shrine. In February, General Hassan Shateri, also of the Revolutionary Guards, had been killed while travelling from Beirut to Damascus.

2014
Iran has stepped up support on the ground for Syrian President Assad, providing hundreds more military specialists to gather intelligence and train troops. This further backing from Tehran, along with deliveries of munitions and equipment from Moscow, is helping to keep Assad in power. This surge of support was in part a decision strongly promoted by Qasem Soleimani, the head of the Quds force, to exploit the outbreak of infighting between rebel fighters and the al-Qaeda inspired Islamic State of Iraq and Sham (ISIS).

A former Iranian Revolutionary Guard forces commander said that "top Quds force commanders were tasked with advising and training Assad's military and his commanders", adding that "Revolutionary Guards directed the fighting on the instructions of the Quds Force commanders". In addition there are thousands of Iranian paramilitary Basij volunteer fighters as well as Shi'ites from Iraq. Former Iranian officials and a Syrian opposition source also put the count of those auxiliary forces in the thousands.

A Syrian opposition source said in recent months Iranian led forces had begun operating in coastal areas including Tartous and Latakia. They have local ID cards, wear Syrian military fatigues and work with the elite Syrian Air Force intelligence unit.

2015

The Wall Street Journal reported on 2 October 2015 that Iran's Revolutionary Guard (the IRGC) has had some 7,000 IRGC members and Iranian paramilitary volunteers operating in Syria and was planning to expand its presence in the country through local fighters and proxies.  The Journal also reported that some experts estimate 20,000 Shiite foreign fighters are on the ground, backed by both Shiite Iran and Hezbollah.

At least 121 IRGC troops, including several commanders, have been killed in the Syrian Civil War since it began.

Key victories were achieved with substantial support provided by the Quds force, namely the al-Ghab plains battles, Aleppo offensives, Dara'aya offensives of 2015 and the al-Qusayr offensives which established government and Hezbollah control over the northern Qalamoun region and the border crossings from Lebanon to Syria. In June 2015, some reports suggested that the Iranian military were effectively in charge of the Syrian government troops on the battlefield.

After the loss of Idlib province to a rebel offensive in the first half of 2015, the situation was judged to have become critical for Assad's survival. High level talks were held between Moscow and Tehran in the first half of 2015 and a political agreement was achieved. On 24 July General Qasem Soleimani visited Moscow to devise the details of the plan for coordinated military action in Syria.

In mid-September 2015, the first reports of new detachments from the Iranian revolutionary guards arriving in Tartus and Latakia in west Syria were made. With much of the Syrian Arab Army and National Defence Forces units deployed to more volatile fronts, the Russian Marines and Iranian Revolutionary Guard (IRG) have relieved their positions by installing military checkpoints inside the cities of Slunfeh (east Latakia Governorate), Masyaf (East Tartus Governorate) and Ras al-Bassit (Latakia coastal city). There were also further reports of new Iranian contingents being deployed to Syria in early October 2015.

On 1 October 2015, citing two Lebanese sources, Reuters reported that hundreds of Iranian troops had arrived in Syria over the previous 10 days to join Syrian government forces and their Lebanese Hezbollah allies in a major ground offensive backed by Russian air strikes that started on 30 September 2015 and were welcomed as vital by Bashar Assad.

On 8 October 2015, brigadier general Hossein Hamadani, the deputy to General Qasem Soleimani in Syria was killed. On 12 October, two more senior commanders of the Iranian Revolutionary Guard Corps, Hamid Mokhtarband and Farshad Hassounizadeh, were reported by Iranian media to have been killed in Syria.

At the end of October 2015, Iran agreed to take part in the Syria peace talks in Vienna. The talks for the first time brought Iran to the negotiating table with Saudi Arabia, which are said to be engaged in a proxy war in Syria.  The talks however were promptly followed by an exchange of sharp rebukes between Iran's and Saudi Arabia's top officials that cast doubt on Iran's future participation in those.

2017

In June 2017, Iran attacked militants' targets in the Deir Ezzor area in eastern Syria with ballistic missiles fired from western Iran. As a result of these attacks (in an operation which was named as the missile operation of "Laylat al-Qadr"), more than 170 forces of ISIS among a number of its commanders were killed.

2018

In May 2018, Iranian Quds forces based in Syria launched a 20 rockets attack on Israel. None of the rockets hit any targets and Israeli aircraft responded by extensively hitting both Syrian and Iranian military sites in Syria.

2019
In January 2019, the Israel Defense Forces confirmed that it had carried out strikes against Iranian military targets in Syria several hours after a rocket was intercepted over the Golan Heights. The Israeli military claimed in a statement that Quds Force positions were targeted and included a warning to the Syrian military against "attempting to harm Israeli forces or territory."

2020

Between 27 February and 3 March, 4 Iranians were killed by Turkish forces. On 7 March, an IRGC commander, Farhad Dabirian, was reported to be killed a day earlier in the Sayyidah Zaynab neighborhood in Damascus, without giving details on the circumstances of his death. On 18 March, an Iranian commander, Mehran Azizani, was announced to be killed by Jabhat al-Nusra in Syria. On 15 May, Another commander, Abu al-Fadl Sarlak, was announced to be killed probably by an Israeli airstrike in Khanasir.

Public opinion
The fierce insistence of Iran's ruling clerics to engage actively in the Syrian crisis is driven by sectarianism rather than political strategy. The great differences between the Alawites and the Twelver Shiites have been apparently overlooked. Although the Assad government has enjoyed a political alliance with ruling clerics in Iran from the time of its establishment, this alliance is not driven by any common religious/sectarian causes; the Ba'ath government in Syria does not participate in Iranian religious issues, and the Ayatollahs in Iran do not consider Assad a Shiite partner.

In a March 2018 ORB International poll of 1,011 adults across all of Syria's 14 governorates, 64% of Syrians said that Iran's influence on their country was an overall neagative, while 32% said Iran's influence was an overall positive.

Casualties

Despite Iran's costly presence in Syria, public support for military involvement in Syria remains strong among the Iranians because of religious motivations and security concerns. From January 2013 to March 2017, the Islamic Revolutionary Guard Corps lost 2,100 soldiers in Syria and 9,000 wounded, according to Iran's veterans’ affairs office. These included 418 ranking officers and several generals In August 2017, Brigadier General Hamid Abazari stated that 25% of the soldiers that Iran had sent to Syria had been killed or wounded, implying several tens of thousands had served. In March 2019, IRGC officer and strategist Hassan Abbasi stated that 2,300 Iranians "went to Syria where they were martyred in recent years." Iranian-backed militias have also incurred heavy losses, with Liwa Fatemiyoun alone reporting over 10,000 casualties (2,000+ killed, 8,000+ wounded) by January 2018.

Notable officer deaths

Iran

Afghanistan

See also
 Hezbollah involvement in the Syrian Civil War
 Iran and ISIL
 Iran–Syria relations
 Russia–Syria–Iran–Iraq Coalition
 Foreign involvement in the Syrian Civil War

References

Further reading
An analysis of Iranian Strategy in Syria, by Will Fulton, Joseph Holliday, and Sam Wyer, Institute for the Study of War

Involvement in the Syrian civil war by country
Iran–Syria military relations
Iran–Saudi Arabia relations
Iran–Saudi Arabia military relations
Iran–Saudi Arabia proxy conflict
Islamic State of Iraq and the Levant and Iran